Cadenazzi Rock is a rock outcrop  east of Roper Point on the west slope of Mount Takahe in Marie Byrd Land. It was mapped by the United States Geological Survey from surveys and from U.S. Navy tricamera aerial photos, 1959–66, and named by the Advisory Committee on Antarctic Names for Lieutenant Michael P. Cadenazzi, a U.S. Navy LH-34 helicopter commander. He flew close support missions for United States Antarctic Research Program scientists during the 1969–70 and 1970–71 seasons.

References 

Rock formations of Marie Byrd Land